Kenneth Minimah,   (born 27 July 1959) is a retired Nigerian army lieutenant general who served as Nigeria's Chief of Army Staff (COAS).

Early life
Kenneth T. J. Minimah was born on 27 July 1959 in Opobo Kingdom, Rivers State, Nigeria.
He attended Township Primary School in Opobo between 1965 and 1971 and Baptist High School for his secondary education from 1972 to 1977. He later attended the College of Science and Technology, Port Harcourt.
He was admitted into the Nigerian Defence Academy on 3 January 1979 and was commissioned as a second lieutenant into the Corps of Nigerian infantry on 18 December 1981.
He obtained a Bachelor of Arts (B.A.) degree in international studies and a Master of Science (M.Sc.) degree in strategic studies from the University of Ibadan.

Military life
He served at different levels in the Nigerian Army before he was appointed Chief of Army Staff (COAS). He served as the General Officer Commanding 81 Division, Commanding Officer of the 149 Infantry Battalion, Commanding Officer of the Nigerian Battalion 2,  Commandant Officer of the Nigerian Army School of Infantry and as the Director of Standards and Combat Readiness.

Medals and awards
He has been the recipient of several medals. He has received the Commander of the Federal Republic, CFR, as well as several designations from the Nigerian Army, including the Meritorious Service Star (MSS), Forces Service Star (FSS), Passed Staff College Dagger (psc(+)), and the Distinguished Service Star (DSS).

References

Nigerian military personnel
Nigerian Army personnel
1959 births
Living people
Nigerian generals
Rivers State military personnel
University of Ibadan alumni
People from Opobo
Nigerian Defence Academy alumni
Chiefs of Army Staff (Nigeria)